Estadio Complejo Deportivo Moca 86 is a soccer stadium in Moca, Dominican Republic.  It is currently used for football matches and hosts the home games of Moca FC of the Liga Dominicana de Fútbol.  The stadium holds 4,000 spectators.

References

Football venues in the Dominican Republic
Buildings and structures in Espaillat Province
Moca FC